Lovelady is an unincorporated community in Pickett County, Tennessee, United States. It lies near State Route 111 west of the town of Byrdstown, the county seat of Pickett County.

References

Unincorporated communities in Pickett County, Tennessee
Unincorporated communities in Tennessee